Falaise may refer to:

Places
 Falaise, Ardennes, France
 Falaise, Calvados, France
 The Falaise pocket was the site of a battle in the Second World War
 La Falaise, in the Yvelines département, France
 The Falaise escarpment in Quebec City, Canada
 Falaise, Harry Guggenheim's Sands Point home

Other
 Treaty of Falaise, December 1174 between the captive William I, King of Scots, and the English King Henry II